Dean William Wendell "Donk" White (May 30, 1923 – June 24, 1992) was an American professional basketball player. He played for half of one season at Valparaiso University before he left school to play professionally. He then played in the National Basketball League for the Sheboygan Red Skins in five games during the 1946–47 season and averaged 4.2 points per game. White also spent two seasons in the Pacific Coast Professional Basketball League.

References

1921 births
1992 deaths
United States Marine Corps personnel of World War II
American men's basketball players
Basketball players from Illinois
Basketball players from Ohio
Forwards (basketball)
People from Malta, Ohio
Sheboygan Red Skins players
Valparaiso Beacons men's basketball players